East Lexham is a village and former civil parish, now in the parish of Lexham, in the Breckland district, in the English county of Norfolk. In 1931 the parish had a population of 160.

History
East Lexham's name is of Anglo-Saxon origin and derives from the Old English for 'leech homestead', likely in the sense of a physician.

In the Domesday Book, East and West Lexham are listed together as a settlement of 45 households in the hundred of Launditch. In 1086, the village was divided between the East Anglian estates of William de Warenne and Ralph de Beaufour.

On 1 April 1935 the parish was abolished and to form Lexham.

Geography
East Lexham falls within the constituency of Mid Norfolk and is represented at Parliament by George Freeman MP of the Conservative Party. For the purposes of local government, the parish falls within the district of Breckland.

St. Andrew's Church
East Lexham's parish church is dedicated to Saint Andrew and is one of Norfolk's 124 remaining Anglo-Saxon round-tower churches. St. Andrew's has been dated to the Eleventh Century with a significant restoration effort made in the late-Nineteenth Century. The church possesses good examples of Nineteenth Century stained glass including one depiction of Saint Michael and the dragon installed by James Powell and Sons. Furthermore, the church features examples of artwork by Richard Foster depicting the Nativity, Saint Andrew as a fisherman and the Day of Judgement. Furthermore, St. Andrew's is thought to be one of the oldest churches in England. Pevsner dates the building easily to the time of the Anglo-Saxons with mound the church stands on providing evidence of the site of earlier Pagan worship, with the church being taken over by the Christians in the Seventh Century. The original church may well have been built of wood or wattle and daub. The most recent research has also suggested, like Pevsner, that the current church was built by Saxons but with a Norman influence. This conclusion has been made due to the style and design of the three belfry openings which have all been constructed differently. The east opening has a unique stone frame cut out to form a maltese cross. Within the belfry is one bell which has a Latin inscription which translates to I am called the bell of Virgin exalted Mary, the bell is thought to have been cast by Brasyers of Norwich in the 15th century.

Transport
The nearest railway station is at King’s Lynn for the Fen Line which runs between King’s Lynn and Cambridge. The nearest airport is Norwich International Airport.

War Memorial
East Lexham's war memorial takes the form of a ornate plaque depicting Saint Michael and the Dragon, located inside St. Andrew's Church. The memorial lists the following names for the First World War:
 Lance-Corporal Harry Nice MM (d.1918), 7th Battalion, Royal Norfolk Regiment
 Acting-Bombardier Ernest W. Seaman (d.1916), Machine Gun Corps
 Private Arthur J. Sculpher (1896-1918), 3rd Battalion, Coldstream Guards
 Private William Crisp (d.1916), 11th Battalion, Essex Regiment
 Private George W. R. Butcher (1883-1915), 1/5th Battalion, Royal Norfolk Regiment
 Private Charles W. Wilgress (1891-1916), Queen's Royal Regiment

References

External Links

St Andrew's on the European Round Tower Churches website
The Norfolk Churches Site: St Andrew, East Lexham
Maplandia - East Lexham
Genuki - East Lexham

Villages in Norfolk
Former civil parishes in Norfolk
Breckland District